Wola Górecka  is a village in the administrative district of Gmina Brzozów, within Brzozów County, Podkarpackie Voivodeship, in south-eastern Poland.

References
Notes

Villages in Brzozów County